Gema Soliveres Cholbi (born 3 November 2000) is a Spanish footballer who plays as a midfielder for Alavés.

Club career
Soliveres started her career at Valencia B.

References

External links
Profile at La Liga

2000 births
Living people
Women's association football midfielders
Spanish women's footballers
People from Xàbia
Sportspeople from the Province of Alicante
Footballers from the Valencian Community
Deportivo Alavés Gloriosas players
Primera División (women) players
Segunda Federación (women) players